Zombie Lake is a 1981 Spanish-French horror film directed by Jean Rollin and Julian de Laserna. The film starred Howard Vernon as the mayor of a small French town that is plagued by Nazi zombies who were killed by the town's villagers 20 years earlier. It was distributed by Eurociné.

Zombie Lake has received generally negative reviews from contemporary critics who focused their reviews on the film's low production quality and similarity to Ken Wiederhorn's Shock Waves (1977).

Plot
The story opens in a small French village 20 years after World War II. The villagers refer to a small nearby lake known as the "lake of the damned." A group of young women go skinnydipping in the lake and are attacked by zombie Nazi soldiers who drown them. The zombies later leave the lake and attack women within the town. The mayor of the town (Howard Vernon) refuses to take action against the zombie attacks until reporter Katya Moore (Marcia Sharif) arrives to investigate.

After Moore returns a book to the mayor,  they discuss the history of the town during the German occupation. His story is about a young Nazi soldier who protected a local woman from enemy gunfire. He was nursed back to health by the woman, who offered him her pendant and had sex with him. Returning to the woman later, the soldier found her dying after giving birth to their daughter Helena. The soldier and his entire platoon were then murdered by a group of townspeople led by the mayor, and their bodies disposed of in the lake.

The mayor says that he believes the zombies are the soldiers returning from the dead. Later, a female basketball team visiting the town is attacked by the zombies. Given the scale of the tragedy, the mayor calls the police, who send two detectives over to investigate. They too are killed by the zombies. The mayor then devises a plan to use the zombie's relationship with Helena by having her lure them into a mill. The zombies enter the mill, which is then destroyed by the villagers using flamethrowers.

Production
Zombie Lake was initially going to be directed by Jesus Franco. After working on the film's plot, Franco left the project after arguing with the film's distributor Eurociné over the sparse budget. Eurociné asked Rollin to direct the film, and he entered production with only a few days notice. Rollin later said in interviews he only did the film as a favor for the Lesoeurs, and that if he had known how bad the script was, he would not have done it. He later deleted it from his filmography (the film did very well financially, however).

Julian de Laserna directed parts of the film under the supervision of Rollin. The final film credited them both under the pseudonym "J.A. Lazer". Rollin appeared in the film as Inspector Spitz.

The film was written by Julián Esteban and Eurociné producer Marius Lesoeur. Lesoeur was credited under the pseudonym of A.L. Mariaux.

The film had two separate editors. Claude Gros was the editor for the French and international versions of the film while Maria Luisa Soriano was the editor for the Spanish version.

The score by Daniel White  was described by Tim Lucas in Video Watchdog as "taken from at least four other movies".

Release
Zombie Lake was released in France on 13 May 1981, at a running time of 90 minutes.

Home media
Zombie Lake was released by Wizard Home Video on VHS.

The film was released on DVD first by Image Entertainment, as part of their Euro Shock collection, on 27 March 2001, and then by Arrow Films on February 9, 2004.

The film was released on Blu-ray and DVD by Kino on 26 February 2013.

Reception
Tim Lucas wrote in Video Watchdog that Zombie Lake was "an undeniably sloppy film". Lucas also noted the production quality citing poor make-up, score and acting from Anoushka. PopMatters gave the film a rating of 4 out of 10, declaring that it was not as good as the earlier Nazi zombie film Shock Waves. Glenn Kay, author of Zombie Movies: The Ultimate Guide criticized the acting and make-up in the film and stated that "the sound mix is one of the worst recorded for a feature film." Horror website Bloody Disgusting gave the film a 2 out of 5 rating, praising it as a non-typical zombie film, but criticized the cheap effects, calling it "crappy and terribly slow". Online film database AllMovie gave the film 1 of 5 stars, stating that "those looking for a better treatment of the same plot should consider Ken Wiederhorn's Shock Waves instead".  Adam Tyner of DVD Talk rated it 0.5 out of 5 and described it as "pretty much unwatchable."  In a mixed review, Gordon Sullivan of DVD Verdict wrote that it was only for hardcore Rollin fans.  Writing in The Zombie Movie Encyclopedia, Peter Dendle described the film as a "mediocre horror piece but a biting satire of sentimental movies." Dendle called the makeup laughable and criticized the acting as uninspired.

See also
List of French films of 1981
List of horror films of 1981
List of Spanish films of 1981

Notes

References

External links

1981 films
1981 horror films
French horror films
Spanish zombie films
Nazi zombie films
Films directed by Jean Rollin
Films set in the 1950s
French zombie films
1980s French films